Aerocondor (ATA Aerocondor Transportes Aéreos Lda.) was one of the first private capital Portuguese airlines certified by the Instituto Nacional de Aviação Civil (INAC) (National Institute for Civil Aviation) to transport passengers, as well as operating flight school operations based in Cascais. The regional airline operated scheduled services in mainland Portugal and to Madeira, as well as scheduled passenger services in France and charter services to the United Kingdom and Spain, from bases at Lisbon(-Portela de Sacavem) and Funchal/Madeira(-Santa Cruz/Santa Catarina), and its flight school in Cascais(-Tires) Aerodrome.

History
The airline began operations in 1975, under the auspices of the Aerocondor Group. Aerocondor was founded by former Colonel in the Portuguese Air Force, Victor Brito, with the assistance of his oldest son, Victor João Brito. During the course of its first years, the airline operated regular flights between Bragança and Vila Real, with private passenger and cargo flights to destinations in Europe, Africa and Middle East. It operated a small fleet of robust bi-motor turboprop aircraft.

The need for qualified pilots lead the Aerocondor Group to provide flight-training school operations. This sector was enhanced with the addition of Victor Brito's second oldest son, José Manuel Brito, who served as vice-president of the company.

It was owned by Aerocondor SGPS (85.15%) and Gestair Group (14.85%) and had 90 employees, with headquarters at Cascais-Tires Aerodrome.

In May 2008, the airline suspended scheduled domestic operations in Portugal.

Flight Training
Yet, as flight operations failed, its aviation school continued to grow, under the hands of Spanish investors who changed its name to Gestair (between 2010 and 2013), when it became part of the GAir Group. Under this umbrella GAir Training Centres expanded flight school bases into Bergamo (Italy), Madrid (Spain) and a new base northeast of their headquarters in Ponte de Sor, supported by an investment of over 50 million euros. This provided the company with capital to develop an ambitious plan to train the next generation of pilots, offering training and installation services in a multicultural environment. After one year the school changed their headquarters from their base in Cascais to Ponte de Sor. It was integrated into the L3 Commercial Training Solutions company, one of the largest pilot training facilities, along with CTC Aviation (now L3 CTC).

Destinations
Aerocondor operated services to the following scheduled domestic destinations:
 Bragança (BGC/LPBG)
 Vila Real (-Tras os Montes) (VRL/LPVR)
In addition, it served international seasonal services to and from Agen and Bragança, as well as charter fights between the islands of Madeira and Porto Santo.

Fleet

Since June 2008, Aerocondor is not in possession of any aircraft any more due to financial problems. Initial plans were to purchase or lease Boeing 757 or 767 aircraft in order to expand, but instead bankruptcy was declared. Formerly operated aircraft include:
ATR 42-300
Dornier 228
Shorts 360
Piper Chieftain (for air taxi services)

References

External links

Defunct airlines of Portugal
Airlines established in 1975
Airlines disestablished in 2008
Cascais Municipal Aerodrome
Portuguese companies established in 1975